Progreso Municipality may refer to:

 Progreso Municipality, Coahuila, a municipality in the state of Coahuila, Mexico
 Progreso Municipality, Yucatán, a municipality in the state of Yucatán, Mexico

Municipality name disambiguation pages